Asma Mamdot is a Pakistani politician who had been a member of the National Assembly of Pakistan, from June 2013 to May 2018.

Early life and education
She was born in Lahore into the royal family of the Mamdots, who were ethnic Kheshgi Afghans. She is a medical doctor by profession and completed her MBBS from King Edward Medical University.

Political career
She was elected to the Provincial Assembly of the Punjab as a candidate of Pakistan Muslim League (F) (PML-F) on a reserved seat for women in 2008 Pakistani general election.

In February 2013, she joined Pakistan Peoples Party (PPP). In March 2013, she joined Pakistan Muslim League (N) (PML-N).

She was elected to the National Assembly of Pakistan as a candidate of PML-N on a reserved seat for women from Punjab in 2013 Pakistani general election.

Family
She belongs from notable political family of Mamdots and Legharis. She is granddaughter of Shahnawaz Khan Mamdot.

References

Living people
Pakistani medical doctors
Pakistani women medical doctors
Punjab MPAs 2008–2013
Pakistani MNAs 2013–2018
Women members of the National Assembly of Pakistan
Year of birth missing (living people)
Pakistan Muslim League (F) politicians
Pakistan Muslim League (N) MNAs
Asma
King Edward Medical University alumni
Politicians from Lahore
Women members of the Provincial Assembly of the Punjab
21st-century Pakistani women politicians